Filippo Cortesi (8 Octobter 1876 – 1 February 1947) was the Apostolic Nuncio to Poland from December 24, 1936 to February 1, 1947. Cortesi earlier served as nuncio to Paraguay in the interim. Cortesi was the only nuncio to Poland never to become a cardinal.

Biography
As nuncio to Paraguay, Cortesi arranged a prisoner exchange between Paraguay and Bolivia during the Chaco War in 1934. As nuncio in Buenos Aires, Cortesi presented the Supreme Order of Christ, the highest papal order, to Argentine President Agustín Pedro Justo on behalf of Pope Pius XII later that year.
 
On April 30, 1939, on the eve of the German invasion of Poland, Cardinal Secretary of State Luigi Maglione sent a message—worded by Mussolini and personally approved by Pius XII—to Cortesi supporting the return of Danzig to Germany. Cortesi replied by cable, questioning the wisdom of such a concession, but Maglione ordered him to pass it on to the Polish president.  The following day Pius XII issued a "last appeal in favor of peace" entreating the "governments of Germany and Poland do their utmost to avoid every incident and abstain from taking any step capable for worsening the present tension".

Cortesi submitted Pius XII's mediation plan to Foreign Minister Józef Beck, but received "an evasive answer because the Poles do not favor mediation as a means of solving the Danzig problem". Cortesi arrived in Rome on June 22 with noncommital replies from all five countries involved in the mediation, and met with Maglione over the mediation and also the rift between Polish and German Catholics. On June 26, Cortesi met with Pius XII personally to convey the negative reactions of President Ignacy Mościcki and Foreign Minister Beck to Pius XII's proposal to transfer Danzig to Germany. Cortesi's relaying of Pius XII's proposal to give Danzig to Germany was long remembered in Poland, particularly when the Communist government came into conflict with the pope after the war.

Cortesi fled his Warsaw nunciature on September 5, following the Polish government-in-exile and arriving in Bucharest. The Vatican received word from Cortesi on September 22 from Bucharest, having been "completely cut off from the Catholics in Poland". At that time, all the Polish bishops—with the exception of Cardinal August Hlond, the primate of Poland (who was at that time expected to return soon)—were still in their bishoprics.

Although Pius XII said that he would not formally recognize the government-in-exile (then in Paris) until he received a full report from Cortesi, Kazimierz Papée, the ambassador from Poland, remained accredited to the Holy See. Pius XII recognized the government-in-exile "with as much formality as is possible under the circumstances" on October 7, aided by the "convenient fact" that Cortesi was due to retire and could not return to Warsaw in any case. The New York Times reported that Cortesi "will not return to Warsaw even if a new Polish state is formed, but will return to Rome and await his almost certain elevation to the Cardinalate". The Times also reported that the nuncio to Paris would be made internuncio to the government-in-exile to avoid having to formally replace Cortesi. Alfredo Pacini was appointed chargé d'affaires while the government-in-exile remained in Paris, and William Godfrey took over as chargé d'affaires once the government-in-exile was forced to move to London in 1940.

The Vatican attempted to get the Nazis to greenlight Cortesi's return—as an apostolic visitor (a step below recognition of sovereignty). From Romania, Cortesi organized a relief effort to Poland. Cortesi eventually arrived in Rome, leaving Cesare Orsenigo, the nuncio to Germany, as the de facto nuncio to Poland. On November 1, 1939, Orsenigo's authority was formally extended to Poland.

Episcopal succession

Having consecrated Zenobio Lorenzo Guilland to the episcopacy, Cortesi is in the episcopal lineage of Pope Francis.

Notes

References
Blet, Pierre, and Johnson, Lawrence J. 1999. Pius XII and the Second World War: According to the Archives of the Vatican. Paulist Press. .
Cornwell, John. 1999. Hitler's Pope: The Secret History of Pius XII. Viking. .
Gallagher, Charles R. 2008. Vatican Secret Diplomacy. Yale University Press. .
Spector, Robert Melvin. 2004. World Without Civilization. University Press of American. .

Apostolic Nuncios to Poland
Pope Pius XII and World War II
Apostolic Nuncios to Argentina
Apostolic Nuncios to Paraguay
Pontifical Ecclesiastical Academy alumni
20th-century Italian Roman Catholic titular archbishops
1876 births
1947 deaths